Independencia is one of the 14 municipalities of the state of Yaracuy, Venezuela. The municipality is located in central Yaracuy, occupying an area of 98 km ² with a population of 57,811 inhabitants in 2011. The capital lies at Independencia.

References

Municipalities of Yaracuy